Robert Joseph Regan is a Grammy nominated American country music songwriter. His chart credits include "Til Love Comes Again" by Reba McEntire, "Busy Man" by Billy Ray Cyrus, "Your Everything" by Keith Urban, "Soon" by Tanya Tucker, "Thinkin' About You" by Trisha Yearwood, "Running Out of Reasons to Run" by Rick Trevino, "Something About a Woman" by Jake Owen, "Dig Two Graves" by Randy Travis, and many others. His songs have been recorded by artists ranging from cowboy legend Roy Rogers to Kenny Rogers, from Hank Williams Jr. to Andy Williams.

In 2012, Regan founded Operation Song, a program which brings professional songwriters together with veterans and active duty military to help them tell their stories in song. To date there have been over 1200 songs written with veterans of World War II to those currently serving. Regan has also been a studio musician, a guitarist on the Grand Ole Opry (with Jeanne Pruitt,) and was a three-term President of the Board of the Nashville Songwriters Association International as well as their Legislative Chair. In that role in 2006, he helped pass the Songwriters Capital Gains Tax Equity Act. Regan also taught as an adjunct professor at Belmont University in the inaugural year of their songwriting program.

Early life
Regan was born in Sacramento, California, was raised in South Lake Tahoe.

Chart singles written by Bob Regan

The following is a list of Bob Regan compositions that were chart hits.

Awards

References

Bob Regan at NSAI
LA Times

External links
 Official website
 
 
 Ascap entry for Bob Regan
 https://web.archive.org/web/20130127055619/http://www.watchgmctv.com/news/and-nominees-are-43rd-annual-dove-award-nominations-announced-atlanta

American country songwriters
American male songwriters
Living people
Musicians from Sacramento, California
Songwriters from California
People from South Lake Tahoe, California
Year of birth missing (living people)